Unfinished Revolution may refer to:

The Unfinished Revolution, technology book
Unfinished Revolution (Christy Moore album), album by Christy Moore